The 2010 Houston Cougars football team (also known as the Houston Cougars, Houston, or UH) represented the University of Houston in the 2010 NCAA Division I FBS football season. It was the 65th year of season play for Houston. The team was coached by third-year head football coach Kevin Sumlin, and played its home games at Robertson Stadium—a 32,000-seat stadium on campus in Houston.  The program is a member of Conference USA in its West Division. Although ranked favorably early in the season, the team finished with a 5–7 record, (4–4 in C-USA play) after season-ending injuries to starting quarterback Case Keenum and other key players.

Previous season
The 2009 Houston Cougars team defeated the nationally ranked Oklahoma State Cowboys in their first match-up. Following the victory, the Cougars were ranked by the AP Poll for the first time in more than twenty years. The Cougars played the Texas Tech Red Raiders in front of a record-breaking 32,114 sold-out crowd at Robertson Stadium.

Pre-season

Recruits
Houston's 2010 recruiting class was highly rated relative to its previous seasons.  Rated as the No. 45 best recruiting class in the nation ahead of TCU and behind Oregon State by Rivals.com, the 2010 class was Houston's highest-ever ranking by the site.  Scout.com ranked Houston as #54, which was the highest Houston had been ranked since 2003, and the 3rd-highest-ever ranking by the site.

This was also the highest-rated recruiting class in Conference USA by both sites for the season.  In terms of position, Houston ranked No. 13 in the nation by Scout.com for best average ratings of quarterbacks recruited.  This reinforced the team's depth in the position, as senior Case Keenum was scheduled to compete in his last season in 2010.

Coaching staff

Top 25 rankings
During the pre-season, Houston was ranked in several notable top 25 polls.  Sports Illustrated placed Houston at No. 21 in its power rankings list. Lindy's Sports ranked Houston as #23, and Phil Steele ranked the team as #24. Just outside the top 25, Sporting News ranked Houston as #26, and in the Coaches' Poll as #27.

Awards & award watch lists
Case Keenum
Davey O'Brien Award watch list
Johnny Unitas Golden Arm Award watch list
Manning Award watch list
Maxwell Award
Walter Camp Award watch list
Conference USA Preseason Offensive Player of the Year
Conference USA Preseason offensive first team selection

Jamal Robinson
Conference USA Preseason defensive first team selection

James Cleveland
Fred Biletnikoff Award watch list
Conference USA Preseason offensive first team selection

Marcus McGraw
Bronko Nagurski Trophy watch list
Lombardi Award watch list
Conference USA Preseason defensive first team selection

Patrick Edwards
Fred Biletnikoff Award watch list

Tyron Carrier
Fred Biletnikoff Award watch list
Paul Hornung Award watch list
Conference USA Preseason Special Teams Player of the Year
Conference USA Preseason special teams first team selection

Roster

Schedule

Denotes the largest crowd to have watched a football game at Robertson Stadium in its current capacity, and the largest Houston had ever hosted on-campus.  This broke the record set during last season versus Texas Tech.
Denotes a tie for largest crowd to have watched a football game at Robertson Stadium in its current capacity, and a tie for the largest Houston had ever hosted on-campus.  This matched the attendance of the previous week.

Game summaries

Texas State

As a season opener, Houston met with Texas State of the Southland Conference (a Division I FCS conference) for the fourth time in history.  However, the two teams had not competed against each other in over six decades, with the last game being in 1948.  Texas State had been undefeated against Houston, and were led by fourth-year head coach Brad Wright.

Attendance was at an all-time high for Robertson Stadium, as 32,119 fans watched the game.  The record-setting crowd at the stadium surpassed the previous season record against Texas Tech.  This marked the largest home-opening crowd to watch the Cougars play since 37,652 fans watched Houston face California at the Astrodome on September 6, 1997.  Quarterback Case Keenum set school records for both career passing yards and career pass attempts, surpassing then-current Philadelphia Eagles starting quarterback Kevin Kolb.

UTEP

Conference USA foe UTEP traveled to Robertson Stadium to face-off against Houston for the eighth time in history.  Prior to UTEP's defeat, Houston's record against the team stood at 3–4. During the previous season, UTEP defeated No. 12 Houston to knock the team out of the national rankings for a period of time.  The team was led by sixth-year head coach Mike Price who had previously served as head coach for Washington State with Kevin Sumlin as a graduate assistant.  Attendance for the game was again at an all-time high, as the 32,119 fans in attendance tied the previous record from the game prior.  The matchup was nationally televised on ESPN.

The Cougars' offensive strategy appeared to be more focused on rushing rather than the passing game Houston was known for.  It was the first time the team had achieved 300 rushing yards in a game since compiling 377 yards against Texas Southern on November 24, 2007. After an interception thrown by senior Case Keenum to UTEP's Trauvan Nixon in the third quarter of the game, the quarterback attempted to tackle the opposing player.  Keenum suffered a blow to the head, and was removed from the game.  Back-up quarterback Cotton Turner took his place to carry on the win.  It was later reported that Keenum was exhibiting symptoms of a mild concussion, but was showing dramatic improvement two days after the game.  His condition was listed as being "day-to-day".

Following the game, Houston became nationally ranked for the first time since the previous season, as the Cougars entered both the AP Poll and Coaches' Poll as #23.  Junior running back Bryce Beall was named the Conference USA offensive player of the week.  Houston's record at 2–0, made it the only team in its conference division to remain undefeated overall, and allowed the team to take the number one spot in the standings.

UCLA

Matt Hogan kicked a 29-yard field goal to give the Cougars the first quarter lead. Johnathan Franklin answered with an 11-yard run for a Bruins 7–3 lead. The Bruins scored two touchdowns in the second quarter. Kevin Prince ran for a 2-yard touchdown and Franklin added a 1-yard run touchdown.

In the third quarter, UCLA had a 42-yard field goal by Kai Forbath, the 2009 Lou Groza Collegiate Place-Kicker Award winner, and a touchdown again by Franklin (12 yards).
Houston scored twice in the fourth quarter, on James Cleveland's 10-yard pass from Terrance Broadway and on Matt Hogan's 31-yard field goal.

Two Houston quarterbacks, Case Keenum and Cotton Turner, were injured in the game and are out for the season.

UCLA's Patrick Larimore, who had a career-high and team-high 11 tackles (10 solos), including three for loss, forced a fumble and broke up a pass in the game was named Pac-10 Conference defensive player of the week. He was also named the FWAA/Bronko Nagurski National Defensive Player of the Week.

Tulane

First quarter scoring: Houston – Bryce Beall (3-yard run).

Second quarter scoring: Tulane – Cody Sparks (13-yard pass from Kevin Moore), Devin Figaro (36-yard pass from Moore); Houston – Beall (1-yard run, 1-yard run), Michael Hayes (1-yard run).

Third quarter scoring: Tulane – Cairo Santos (29-yard field goal).

Fourth quarter scoring: Tulane – Payten Jason (9-yard run); Houston – Beall (25-yard run), Loyce Means (42-yard interception return).

Poll rankings

References

Houston
Houston Cougars football seasons
Houston Cougars football